Rhoadsia is a genus of characins endemic to river basins in western Ecuador.  There are currently two described species in this genus.

Species
 Rhoadsia altipinna Fowler, 1911
 Rhoadsia minor C. H. Eigenmann & Henn, 1914

References
 

Characidae
Taxa named by Henry Weed Fowler
Fish of South America
Fish of Ecuador